Ubiquitin specific peptidase 18 (USP18), also known as UBP43, is a type I interferon receptor repressor and an isopeptidase. In humans, it is encoded by the USP18 gene. USP18 is induced by the immune response to type I and III interferons, and serves as a negative regulator of type I interferon, but not type III interferon. Loss of USP18 results in increased responsiveness to type I interferons and life-threatening autoinflammatory disease in humans due to the negative regulatory function of USP18 in interferon signal transduction. Independent of this activity, USP18 is also a member of the deubiquitinating protease family of enzymes. It is known to remove ISG15 conjugates from a broad range of protein substrates, a process known as deISGylation.

Structure 
The USP18 gene consists of 11 exons that encode a 43 kDa protein. The USP18 protein adopts the characteristic hand-like structure of ubiquitin-specific-proteases (USPs), which consists of a finger, palm and thumb domain. At the interface of the palm and thumb domain lies the catalytic site composed of the cysteine protease triad (cysteine, a histidine and an aspartate or asparagine). The C-terminus of USP18 is primarily responsible for negative regulation of interferon-I signaling.

Function 

Following its induction by type I interferons (IFN-Is), USP18 carries out three functional interactions:

Regulation of IFN-I signaling 

USP18 inhibits IFN-I signaling by disrupting the receptor complex and the subsequent JAK-STAT signaling pathway. USP18 binds the IFN-receptor 2 subunit (IFNAR2), leading to the displacement of Janus kinase 1. and the dissociation of the cytokine-receptor complex. This process requires STAT2 to traffic USP18 to the receptor  These events terminate signaling and draw cells into a refractory state with diminished sensitivity to future stimulation.

deISGylation 

Using the isopeptidase domain, USP18 specifically deconjugates ISG15 (interferon-stimulated gene 15) from tagged proteins. This reaction is termed deISGylation, as the initial conjugation of ISG15 to newly synthesized proteins is termed ISGylation, a process akin to ubiquitination. However, unlike other de-ubiquitinating enzymes, USP18 is specific to ISG15, and exhibits no cross-reactivity with ubiquitin. The consequences of ISGylation and deISGylation are incompletely understood.

Stabilization 

USP18 is stabilized by ISG15, but independently of the ubiquitin-like conjugation. Without ISG15-mediated stabilization, USP18 is degraded at the proteasome. This relationship exists in human, canine and porcine USP18/ISG15, but is absent in murine systems.

Promoting factor of HIV infection 
Macrophages and dendritic cells are usually the first point of contact with pathogens, including lentiviruses. Host restriction factors, including SAMHD1, mediate the innate immune response against these viruses. However, HIV-1 has evolved to circumvent the innate immune response and establishes disseminated infection. It was reported that human USP18 is a novel factor potentially contributing to HIV replication by blocking the antiviral function of p21 in differentiated human myeloid cells. USP18 downregulates p21 protein expression, which correlates with upregulated intracellular dNTP levels and the antiviral inactive form of SAMHD1. Depletion of USP18 stabilizes p21 protein expression, which correlates with dephosphorylated SAMHD1 and a block to HIV-1 replication.

Clinical significance 
USP18-deficiency is a very rare primary immunodeficiency caused by mutations of the USP18 gene. The inheritance is autosomal recessive. The clinical disease presents in the perinatal period with life-threatening autoinflammation that mimics TORCH infections, but in the absence of infection. The severe inflammation results from a failure to regulate type I IFN activity, and is therefore considered a type I interferonopathy. This syndrome was initially described to result in death within weeks of birth. Fortunately, this previously lethal condition was recently demonstrated to be curable with a Janus kinase inhibitor and intensive supportive care.

References

Further reading 

 
 
 
 
 
 
 

Enzymes